Charles Brenner (born October 30, 1961) is the inaugural Alfred E Mann Family Foundation Chair of the Department of Diabetes & Cancer Metabolism at the Beckman Research Institute of the City of Hope National Medical Center. Brenner previously held the Roy J. Carver Chair in Biochemistry and was head of biochemistry at the University of Iowa.

Brenner is a major contributor in the field of nicotinamide adenine dinucleotide (NAD) metabolism and has developed targeted, quantitative methods for NAD metabolomics. Brenner discovered eukaryotic nicotinamide riboside (NR) kinase and nucleosidase pathways to NAD.

Brenner's work includes the first human trial of NR, which demonstrated safe oral availability as an NAD+ precursor. 
He has characterized ways in which NAD is disrupted by diseases and  metabolic stress.

Education and career
Brenner graduated from Wesleyan University with a Bachelors degree in biology in 1983.  After working for the biotechnology companies Chiron Corporation and DNAX Research Institute, Brenner attended graduate school at Stanford University School of Medicine. At Stanford he worked with Robert S. Fuller, receiving his Ph.D. in Cancer Biology in 1993. Brenner conducted post-doctoral research at Brandeis University with Gregory Petsko and Dagmar Ringe.

Brenner then joined the faculty at Thomas Jefferson University, where he worked from 1996-2003, becoming Director of the Structural Biology & Bioinformatics Program in 2000.
He moved to Dartmouth Medical School in 2003, serving as Associate Director for Basic Sciences at Norris Cotton Cancer Center (now named Dartmouth Cancer Center) from 2003-2009. In 2009 he joined the University of Iowa (UI) as Professor and Departmental Executive Officer (DEO) of Biochemistry. In 2010 he became the Roy J. Carver Chair of Biochemistry at UI, holding that position until 2020.

In 2020, Brenner joined City of Hope National Medical Center in Duarte, California as the inaugural Alfred E Mann Family Foundation Chair in Diabetes and Cancer Metabolism. City of Hope created the position and the associated Department of Diabetes & Cancer Metabolism to focus on underlying metabolism and the intersection of metabolic disturbances with diseases such as cancer and diabetes.

Brenner has been funded by agencies including
the March of Dimes,
the Burroughs Wellcome Fund,
the Beckman Foundation,
the Lung Cancer Research Foundation,
the Bill & Melinda Gates Foundation,
the Leukemia & Lymphoma Society, 
the National Science Foundation.
and the National Institutes of Health.

Research contributions
Brenner has made multiple contributions to molecular biology and biochemistry, beginning with purification and characterization of the Kex2 proprotein convertase at Stanford.
Significant research projects include the role of Ap3A bindings in the function of the FHIT tumor suppressor gene, 
characterization and inhibition of DNA methylation, and discovery of new steps in nicotinamide adenine dinucleotide (NAD) metabolism.

Notably, the Brenner laboratory discovered that eukaryotes use nicotinamide riboside (NR) to make NAD+. Bieganowski and Brenner (2004) found that NR is converted to NAD+ through the action of nicotinamide ribose kinases including Nrk1 (yeast and human) and Nrk2 (human). Belenky et al (Cell, 2007) reported another pathway which turns NR into NAM through the action of nucleosidases Urh1/Pnp1/Meu1 and is Nrk1 independent.

Brenner has developed targeted, quantitative analysis of the NAD+ metabolome and made fundamental contributions to NAD metabolism including discovery of nicotinic acid riboside-dependent NAD synthesis, elucidating the mechanism of synthesis of nicotinic acid adenine dinucleotide phosphate, and discovering multiple conditions in which NAD metabolism is dysregulated in disease.

Brenner is active in translating NR technologies to treat and prevent human conditions that disturb the NAD system including cancer diabetic and chemotherapeutic peripheral neuropathy,
heart failure, central brain injury,  inflammation, mitochondrial myopathy pellagra, and infections such as coronavirus infection Brenner's work included the first human trial of NR in 2016, which demonstrated safe oral availability as an NAD+ precursor. Though Brenner was the first to show that NR increases SIR2 activity, improves gene silencing, and can extend yeast lifespan,
his work has not emphasized sirtuins or nonspecific anti-aging claims and instead emphasizes how NR repairs metabolic stresses that dysregulate NAD+  and NADPH.

Examining rodents and their offspring, Brenner has showed that rodent postpartum mothers are under severe metabolic stress to their NAD system. Supplementing rodent mothers with NR increases maternal weight loss, advances juvenile development and provides long lasting neurodevelopmental advantages into adulthood.

Brenner is an author of more than 200 peer-reviewed publications. 
He was the senior editor of the 2004 book, Oncogenomics:  Molecular Approaches to Cancer.

Brenner is both cautious and critical of research that promotes claims of anti-aging and longevity.
After writing a favorable review of Steven Austad's book Methuselah's Zoo, he reviewed Lifespan: Why We Age – and Why We Don't Have To by David A. Sinclair, summarizing it as "an influential source of misinformation on longevity, featuring counterfactual claims about longevity genes being conserved between yeast and humans, the existence of supposed activators of these genes, and claimed successful age reversal in mice based on partial reprogramming." Brenner published a major review of sirtuins in 2022 entitled "Sirtuins are not conserved longevity genes".

Educational contributions

In 2012, Brenner and Dagmar Ringe developed pre-medical curriculum recommendations that would be consistent with a revised Medical College Admission Test (MCAT), following a request from the President of the American Society for Biochemistry and Molecular Biology, Suzanne Pfeffer. The recommendations, which include development of inorganic, organic and biochemistry coursework that is more geared toward the chemistry of bioorganic functional groups, have been further refined in academic journals. Brenner's contribution to this area was recognized by the 2016 ASBMB Award for Exemplary Contributions to Education.

Industrial collaborations
Brenner is a former member of the Scientific Advisory Board of Sirtris Pharmaceuticals. He was a co-founder of ProHeathspan prior to its acquisition by ChromaDex, and serves as member of the scientific advisory board and chief scientific advisor to ChromaDex.

Awards
 2020, Mary Swartz Rose Senior Investigator Award, American Society for Nutrition
 2016, ASBMB Award for Exemplary Contributions to Education, American Society for Biochemistry and Molecular Biology
 2013, Fellow, American Association for the Advancement of Science
2007,  William E.M. Lands Lectureship, University of Michigan Medical School
 1998-2001, New Investigator in the Pharmacological Sciences, Burroughs Wellcome Fund
 1998-2000, Basil O'Connor Scholar, March of Dimes Birth Defects Foundation
 1998-2000,  Beckman Young Investigators Award, Arnold and Mabel Beckman Foundation

Selected publications

References

External links
 The Brenner Lab Brenner web page at City of Hope
Brenner twitter profile
 Interviews and podcasts
  Google scholar

Living people
1961 births
American molecular biologists
Wesleyan University alumni
Stanford University School of Medicine alumni
Brandeis University alumni
University of Iowa faculty
City of Hope National Medical Center